Govyadikha is a rural locality (a village) in Klyazminskoye Rural Settlement, Kovrovsky District, Vladimir Oblast, Russia. The population was 10 as of 2010. There are 3 streets.

Geography 
Govyadikha is located 9 km southeast of Kovrov (the district's administrative centre) by road. Gridino is the nearest rural locality.

References 

Rural localities in Kovrovsky District